Pseudobaptigenin synthase is an enzyme with systematic name calycosin,NADPH:oxygen oxidoreductase (methylenedioxy-bridge-forming). This enzyme catalyses the following chemical reaction

 (1) calycosin + NADPH + H+ + O2  pseudobaptigenin + NADP+ + 2 H2O
 (2) pratensein + NADPH + H+ + O2  5-hydroxypseudobaptigenin + NADP+ + 2 H2O

Pseudobaptigenin synthase is a heme-thiolate enzyme (P450) that catalyses a step in the biosynthesis of (-)-maackiain.

References

External links 
 

EC 1.14.21